Bathuel Harrison Iheanyichukwu is a civil engineer and architect, who serves as the current Rivers State Commissioner of Works. He was appointed to this position by Governor Ezenwo Nyesom Wike, confirmed by the Rivers State House of Assembly and sworn in on 9 May 2016. He replaces Kelvin Wachukwu, who was suspended indefinitely on 1 April 2016.

See also
Wike Executive Council
List of people from Rivers State

References

Commissioners of ministries of Rivers State
Engineers from Rivers State
First Wike Executive Council
Rivers State Commissioners of Works